Dmitry Mikhaylovich Tikhy (born 29 October 1992) is a Russian football centre back. He plays for FC Khimki.

Club career
He made his debut in the Russian Football National League for FC Luch-Energiya Vladivostok on 19 August 2011 in a game against FC Chernomorets Novorossiysk.

On 19 January 2019, he signed a 1.5-year contract with FC Yenisey Krasnoyarsk of the Russian Premier League.

On 19 February 2019, before the league resumed after the winter break and Tikhy had a chance to play a single official game for Yenisey, he moved again, to FC Khimki.

He made his Russian Premier League debut for FC Khimki on 8 August 2020 in a game against PFC CSKA Moscow.

Career statistics

References

External links
 
 
 

1992 births
Sportspeople from Vladivostok
Living people
Russian footballers
Association football defenders
FC Luch Vladivostok players
FC Spartak Vladikavkaz players
FC Fakel Voronezh players
FC Tom Tomsk players
FC Yenisey Krasnoyarsk players
FC Khimki players
Russian Premier League players
Russian First League players
Russian Second League players